Medio Cudeyo is a municipality in Cantabria in Spain, around 15 km from Santander.

Municipalities in Cantabria